St Peter's Church was the Anglican Pro-cathedral and Parish church of Liverpool. It was erected in 1700, consecrated on 29 Jun 1704 and demolished in 1922. It was located on Church Street. Its location is now marked by a bronze Maltese cross on Church Street.

History 
The first Oratorio to be performed in Liverpool was Handel's Messiah and was performed in St Peter's Church.

On 1 July 1880, J. C. Ryle was appointed as the first Bishop of Liverpool at which point St Peter's became the pro-cathedral of Liverpool.

The church was replaced as cathedral of Liverpool by the current Liverpool Cathedral.

The church's records are stored in the Liverpool Records Office.

Architecture 

The building was designed by John Moffat and was erected to the South of Church Street. The architecture of the pro-cathedral was criticised for being inconsistent; each of the doorways to the church were of different designs. The church had a single tower which measured 108 feet (33m) in height, the upper part of which was octagonal in shape and contained a peal of ten bells.

The church contained an oak altar which was greatly admired. At the Eastern end was a stained glass window representing Saint Peter and at the Western end was a large organ.

The environment surrounding the church was criticised for being muddy; Church Street was not paved until 1760 and was the site of a weekly cattle market.

Closure and demolition

By the early 20th century, it was felt that Liverpool deserved a more significant building as its cathedral. Construction on the new Liverpool Cathedral commenced in 1904 and by 1922, St Peter's Church was obsolete. The building would be demolished, which would also allow for widening Church Street.
The last service took place in the church in September 1919 before demolition commenced, which was completed on 23 October 1922. That same year, construction work in a new Woolworths store commenced, designed by William Priddle and opened in August 1923.

Today, the only indications that a church was once at the site is the name of the street and a brass Maltese cross set in the granite pavement, placed in the precise location of the doors of the former church.

References 
Citations

Sources

External links 

 Lancashire OnLine Parish Clerks

Destroyed churches in England
Demolished buildings and structures in Liverpool
Churches completed in 1700
1700 establishments in England
Buildings and structures demolished in 1922
1922 disestablishments in England